Jon Rhodes is an Australian photographer  who has been described as a "pioneer" in "the development of a collaborative methodology between high art photography and [Australian] Aboriginal People living in remote communities".  Rhodes' work is represented in all major Australian collections and at the J Paul Getty Museum, Los Angeles.

Early life
Jon Rhodes was born at Wagga Wagga, New South Wales in 1947 and spent his early life in Brisbane, Queensland. After leaving high school in 1965 he was employed at Academy Photographers, and by the time he left for Sydney in early 1968, had photographed over 100 weddings! After unsuccessfully applying for a job as a cleaner at the University of New South Wales, he was offered instead a job as a photographer at T.E.R.C. (Tertiary Education Research Centre), a position he held until 1971. During that time Rhodes filmed Balmain (a documentary about the effects of containerisation on that inner-western suburb), directed by his former school friend Kit Guyatt. Rhodes joined the Commonwealth Film Unit, (CFU), then Film Australia now Screen Australia, as an assistant cinematographer, working on documentaries in Australia, Papua New Guinea and India. He became a cinematographer in 1974 and left Film Australia in 1977 to concentrate on his still photography.

Career

The earliest example of Rhodes' collaborative work with Aboriginal people is his first solo show Just another sunrise? in 1976. The exhibition contrasts the lifestyles of the Yolngu at Yirrkala with those led by the employees of Nabalco Pty Ltd in the town of Nhulunbuy. The Yolngu claimed that Nabalco’s bauxite mining leases across the Gove Peninsula were in breach of their land rights and had instituted legal action in 1968 (Milirrpum v Nabalco Pty Ltd). Just another sunrise? comprises 17 panels, mainly black and white images, but some colour. The introductory panel features Nabalco's rising sun logo (from where the exhibition's title originated), and the text of A brief history of Yirrkala, the title of the exhibition's room brochure. The next seven panels deal with the desecration and the infrastructure of mining; the last nine panels document the "homeland movement", as the Yolngu establish the first settlements at Gurkaway and Djarrakpi, on their traditional clan lands around Blue Mud Bay. Rhodes used the 19 kilometre-long conveyor belt that transports bauxite from the mine to the alumina refinery, as a motif to emphasise the cultural divide.

Just another sunrise? juxtaposes single photographs and series and sequences of images to convey a narrative.  This approach by Rhodes, described as "steadfastly rejecting the idea that everything could be said in a single image, working rather in series which had a filmic feel", contrasts with the "decisive moment" approach of Cartier-Bresson. Rhodes adopted the compositional restrictions of cinematography, namely that the image composed through the view-finder of a movie camera was the image that appeared on-screen, and consequently his un-cropped still photographs are the result of always composing "full-frame", evidenced by the inclusion of black 35mm frame-lines on all his photographic prints.

In 1977 Jenny Boddington curated a joint exhibition of the works of Jon Rhodes and of the landscape photographer Laurie Wilson at the National Gallery of Victoria.
Rhodes' photographs, titled Australia, consisted of 26 pairs of black and white portraits, (literally), photographed between 1972 and 1975.

Rhodes was one of six photographers who were commissioned by the sugar refiner CSR Limited to photograph its refinery at Pyrmont for its centenary in 1978. In the subsequent exhibition, CSR Pyrmont Refinery Project, Rhodes' images emphasised "the repetitive and machine-dominated nature of the work".  He was again commissioned by CSR in 1982, and featured in the exhibition CSR Hunter Valley Coal. 
 
Rhodes contributed two chapters (Yaruman and Yuendumu) to After 200 Years: Photographic Essays of Aboriginal and Islander Australia Today.  This publication was the work of 20 photographers who visited both urban, regional and remote Aboriginal communities between 1985 and 1987 in the course of the After 200 Years Project for the Australian Bicentennial Authority. The Kundat Jaru mob exhibition grew out of the After 200 Years Project and combined the photographs by Rhodes and community members at Yaruman (Ringers Soak). It toured the State Galleries of Victoria, New South Wales, Queensland and Western Australia in 1991-1992.

In 1990 Rhodes spent five months at Kiwirrkura, 700 kilometres west of Alice Springs, where he again spent time with the Pintupi he'd first met in 1974, at Yayayi Bore, just west of Papunya. The subsequent exhibition, Whichaway?, the final in the trilogy of his work from Aboriginal Australia, was accompanied by a catalogue in which he further refined “the art of stopping” in his subtly understated sequences and series. Whichaway? toured Australia’s eastern capitals, Alice Springs, Adelaide, and 20 regional galleries between 1998 and 2002.

In 1992 Rhodes and the painter Carol Ruff were both inspired after reading The Arrernte Landscape of Alice Springs by anthropologist David Brooks, who documented how the infrastructure of Alice Springs had desecrated many of the Arrernte sacred sites – three species of Ancestral “caterpillar beings” formed much of the landscape on the eastern side, while “the activities of the wild dog” shaped many of the hills and valleys on the western side. Site Seeing, Rhodes’ and Ruff's collaborative exhibition consisting of 20 paired works, was shown at the Araluen Centre in Alice Springs in 1994, and toured to Brisbane, Cairns and Sydney in 1995-1997.

Inspired by Site Seeing, in 1994 Rhodes began searching for and photographing some of the "physical reminders of Aboriginal occupation in south-eastern Australia, where the impact of European settlement has been the longest and most intense". By the time Rhodes was awarded an H.C. Coombs Creative Arts Fellowship in 2006, he had photographed about 30 Aboriginal sites around Sydney, Melbourne, south-east Queensland and western New South Wales. The Fellowship enabled Rhodes to spend three months at the Australian National University in Canberra, to seriously research those 30 sites for his upcoming exhibition Cage of Ghosts, scheduled to open at the National Library of Australia in late 2007.

My Trip, the 2014 group exhibition (with Micky Allan and Max Pam), shown at the Art Gallery of New South Wales and curated by Judy Annear, featured 12 works by Rhodes, spanning the years 1974 to 1990, and were selected mainly from Just another sunrise?, Kundat Jaru mob and Whichaway? For the next 10 years since Cage of Ghosts, Rhodes wrote Cage of Ghosts the book, based on the exhibition. He concentrated on eight of the original 36 sites, examining “in vivid and fascinating detail the histories of an extraordinary cast of ethnologists, antiquarians, surveyors, anthropologists and artefact collectors, who were obsessed with documenting Aboriginal culture”. Rhodes “takes the reader on a journey from Sydney and the Eora rock engravings at Point Piper, Bondi, Allambie Heights and Mt. Ku-ring-gai, to ceremonially carved trees on a Kamilaroi bora ground near Collarenebri in north-western NSW. And from the Djab wurrung paintings of Bunjil and his two dingoes in Victoria, to the Ngunnawal scarred trees in the nation’s capital, Canberra”. He intermingles “these esoteric narratives with his personal observations”, and although “solves many of the intriguing puzzles he investigates”, he “raises the one big question yet to be answered – when will the fundamental truth of the 140-year-long Australian Frontier War finally be publicly acknowledged, and memorialised?”Cage of Ghosts won the 2019 NSW Premier's Community and Regional History Prize.

Jon Rhodes has written the sequel Whitefella Way'', published in 2022.

References

20th-century Australian photographers
1947 births
Living people
Artists from Brisbane
Australian cinematographers
Australian Aboriginal culture
21st-century Australian photographers